The 2019 Montana Grizzlies football team represented the University of Montana in the 2019 NCAA Division I FCS football season. The Grizzlies were led by second-year head coach Bobby Hauck, ninth overall as he previously was head coach from 2003–2009, and played their home games on campus at Washington–Grizzly Stadium in Missoula, Montana as a charter member of the Big Sky Conference. They finished the season 10–4, 6–2 in Big Sky play to finish in a three-way tie for third place. They received an at-large bid to the FCS Playoffs where, after a first round bye, they defeated Southeastern Louisiana in the second round before losing to Weber State in the quarterfinals.

Previous season 
The Grizzlies finished the 2018 season 6–5, 4–4 in Big Sky play to finish in a tie for sixth place.

Preseason

Big Sky preseason poll
The Big Sky released their preseason media and coaches' polls on July 15, 2019. The Grizzlies were picked to finish in fifth place by the media, and in fourth place by the coaches.

Preseason All–Big Sky team
The Grizzlies had three players selected to the preseason all-Big Sky team.

Offense

Samuel Akem – WR

Defense

Dante Olson – ILB

Special teams

Jace Lewis – ST

Schedule

Source:

Game summaries

at South Dakota

North Alabama

at Oregon

Monmouth

at UC Davis

Idaho State

at Sacramento State

Eastern Washington

at Portland State

Idaho

Weber State

at Montana State

FCS Playoffs
The Grizzlies entered the postseason tournament as the number six seed, with a first-round bye.

Southeastern Louisiana–Second Round

at Weber State–Quarterfinals

Ranking movements

References

Montana
Montana Grizzlies football seasons
Montana
Montana Grizzlies football